Sestre are a Slovenian drag act that represented Slovenia at the Eurovision Song Contest 2002.

Tomaž (Marlenna), Damjan (Emperatrizz) and Srečko (Daphne) had been performing together since 2000 under the name Suspender Sisters with a classic drag queen show program. While Marlenna and Emperatrizz were known to be escorts  prior to their career in music, Daphne was a student of agronomy.

In February 2002 they worked with the creative team of Dom Svobode and together they created one of the biggest and most controversial entries in Eurovision Song Contest ever. They won the Slovenian pre-selection and so represented Slovenia on Eurovision 2002 in Tallinn. The song "Samo Ljubezen" became a number-one hit.

In Tallinn they drew attention on every step and even though they finished 13th, they still became recognizable throughout Europe.

They started performing all over Europe and were invited to numerous foreign shows in Germany, France, Sweden, Austria, Croatia, Italy, UK, Bosnia, Serbia, Macedonia, and Estonia. They also performed on one of the UK's most popular shows on Channel 4, Eurotrash.

In October 2002, they released their first album, Souvenir by Menart with the support of a co-operational team Dom Svobode: Magnifico, Barbara Pešut and Schatzi. The album was recorded in Slovene, but most of the songs are translated in English, Spanish, French and German.

They made two videos in Belgrade with the popular director Dejan Miličević, and they also received the 'Victor Victoria' award in 2002 for the most popular group in Serbia from Slovenia.

Sestre also won 'Fesion' award in 2002 for the best personal style in Slovenia and the 'Golden Record' award for their first single "Samo Ljubezen".

Their first big solo performance was in December 2002 in Ljubljana's Gala Hall at Hotel Union, which was a great success and with that Sestre became an important part of the Slovene music scene.

References

Eurovision Song Contest entrants for Slovenia
Eurovision Song Contest entrants of 2002
Slovenian musical groups
LGBT-themed musical groups
Drag groups